Volodarsky (masculine), Volodarskaya (feminine), or Volodarskoye (neuter) may refer to:

People 
Boris Volodarsky (born 1955), English historian, specialising in Intelligence History  
Eduard Volodarsky (1941–2012), Russian screenwriter, playwright and cinematographer
Igal Volodarsky (1936-1977), Israeli basketball player
Leonid Volodarskiy (born 1950), Russian movie translator
Peter Wolodarski (born 1978), Swedish journalist and television host
V. Volodarsky (Moisey Markovich Goldshteyn) (1891–1918), Russian revolutionary and early Soviet politician

Places
Volodarsky District, name of several districts in the countries of the former Soviet Union
Volodarsky (rural locality) (Volodarskaya, Volodarskoye), name of several rural localities in Russia
Saumalkol (North Kazakhstan), formerly Volodarskoye

Other
Steamer Volodarskiy, a Russian ship which was active in the Arctic during the 1930s
Volodarsky (Murmansk Shipping Company), a ship used for nuclear waste hauling and storage
Volodarsky Bridge, bridge across the Neva River in St. Petersburg, Russia

See also
Volodarsk (disambiguation)
Wolodarsky Surname